John David Barfield (October 15, 1964 – December 24, 2016) was a Major League Baseball pitcher. He played during three seasons (1989 to 1991) at the major league level for the Texas Rangers. He pitched in the affiliated minor leagues through 1997 and concluded his career the next year in the independent Atlantic League of Professional Baseball. He died in a shooting in Little Rock, Arkansas.

Early life
Barfield attended Pine Bluff High School in Pine Bluff, Arkansas. He starred for the baseball team, which won a state championship. One of his teammates on the Pine Bluff baseball team was future Rangers pitcher Mike Jeffcoat. Barfield played college baseball at Crowder College in Neosho, Missouri, and at Oklahoma City University. He was drafted by the Rangers in the 11th round (267th overall) of the 1986 amateur draft.

Career
By 1988, he had advanced to the Class AA Tulsa Drillers, where he was on the pitching staff with future major leaguers Kevin Brown, Kenny Rogers and Steve Wilson. Barfield was a Texas League All-Star and finished with a 9–9 record with a 2.88 earned run average (ERA).

He made his MLB debut in 1989. He appeared in four games for the Rangers that year, two of them starts, and he gave up eight earned runs in  innings. The next year, he appeared in 33 games, all as a relief pitcher. In 1991, Barfield was the long reliever for the Rangers, but in June, with starting pitchers Bobby Witt and Scott Chiamparino on the disabled list, Barfield made his first start of the season. He pitched  innings and earned the win. He started several more games that season, but he developed a rib fracture which caused pain and poor pitching during his last three starts. In August, the injury sidelined him for the rest of the season.

Between 1992 and 1997, pitched for minor league affiliates of several organizations and spent some time in the Mexican League. His last season in the affiliated minor leagues was with the Buffalo Bisons, the Triple-A affiliate of the Cleveland Indians. In 1998, he pitched in the independent Atlantic League for the Newark Bears and the Atlantic City Surf, winning one of his seven decisions that year.

Death
Barfield was shot during a dispute at his apartment in downtown Little Rock, Arkansas, on December 24, 2016. He was taken to a hospital, where he died during surgery. A 59-year-old acquaintance named William Goodman, who was the estranged husband of Barfield's girlfriend Mystic Goodman, was arrested and charged with first-degree murder. On August 10, 2017, Goodman was convicted of manslaughter after a Pulaski County jury concluded that the killing was reckless but not deliberate and Goodman was sentenced to the maximum 25 years in prison with a $10,000 fine. Goodman was sentenced to 10 years for manslaughter and 15 years for firearm enhancement, with the sentences to be served consecutively.

References

External links
, or Retrosheet, or Pura Pelota (Venezuelan Winter League)

1964 births
2016 deaths
2016 murders in the United States
Algodoneros de Unión Laguna players
American expatriate baseball players in Mexico
American manslaughter victims
Atlantic City Surf players
Baseball players from Arkansas
Birmingham Barons players
Buffalo Bisons (minor league) players
Caribes de Oriente players
Charlotte Rangers players
Crowder Roughriders baseball players
Daytona Beach Admirals players
Deaths by firearm in Arkansas
Major League Baseball pitchers
Nashville Sounds players
Newark Bears players
Oklahoma City 89ers players
Oklahoma City Stars baseball players
People murdered in Arkansas
Salem Redbirds players
San Antonio Missions players
Tecolotes de Nuevo Laredo players
Texas Rangers players
Tiburones de La Guaira players
American expatriate baseball players in Venezuela
Tulsa Drillers players
Sportspeople from Pine Bluff, Arkansas